Middle Tennessee State University (MTSU or MT) is a public university in Murfreesboro, Tennessee. Founded in 1911 as a normal school, the university consists of eight undergraduate colleges as well as a college of graduate studies, together offering more than 300 degree programs through more than 35 departments. MTSU is most prominently known for its Recording Industry, Aerospace, Music and Concrete Industry Management programs. The university has partnered in research endeavors with the Oak Ridge National Laboratory, the United States Army, and the United States Marine Corps. In 2009, Middle Tennessee State University was ranked among the nation's top 100 public universities by Forbes magazine.

Prior to 2017, MTSU was governed by the Tennessee Board of Regents and part of the State University and Community College System of Tennessee. In 2017, governance was transferred to an institutional board of trustees. MTSU is accredited by the Southern Association of Colleges and Schools Commission on Colleges. MTSU athletics programs compete intercollegiately in the NCAA Division I as a member of Conference USA.

History

One of the earliest calls for a normal school occurred in 1855 when a Wilson County, Tennessee, politician wanted to build a normal school in Lebanon, Tennessee. Education efforts collapsed shortly with the breakout of the American Civil War. Later, state superintendents and teachers traveled around the state giving speeches about the dire need of teacher preparation. In 1909, the Tennessee General Assembly moved "to provide for the improvement of the system of Public Education of the State of Tennessee, that is to say, to establish a General Education Fund." The major thrust of this "improvement" embodied in the legislative act that was to become known as the General Education Bill of 1909 was the establishment of three normal or teacher-training institutions. Following the intent of the act that one was to be located in each of the grand divisions of the state, the State Board of Education assigned the Middle Tennessee institution to Murfreesboro.

Middle Tennessee State Normal School (MTSNS or MTNS) opened on September 11, 1911, with a two-year program for training teachers. It evolved into a four-year teachers' college by 1925 with the power of granting the Bachelor of Science degree, and the institution's name was changed for the first time to Middle Tennessee State Teachers College. The school was often abbreviated as "S.T.C." In 1943, the General Assembly designated the institution a state college, changing its name for the second time to Middle Tennessee State College. This new status marked a sharp departure from the founding purpose and opened the way for expanding curricular offerings and programs. In 1965, the institution was advanced to university status, changing its name to Middle Tennessee State University. In October 2010, the Student Government Association at MTSU proposed that the university be renamed to the "University of Middle Tennessee".  However, approval from both the university administration and the Tennessee Board of Regents was required and was not granted.

During the progressive movement from a two-year normal to a university, several significant milestones may be identified. In 1936, the Bachelor of Arts program was added. Responding to the expressed needs of the institution's service area, the Graduate School was established in 1951. To effect better communications and improve administrative supervision, the schools concept was introduced in 1962.

As Middle Tennessee State University developed and grew, the Doctor of Arts program was added in 1970 and the Specialist in Education in 1974. These degree programs became attractive centerpieces for other efforts to improve and enhance institutional roles. Library resources were dramatically increased and sophisticated computer services were developed to aid instruction and administration. A highly trained faculty enabled the university to continue growth in program offerings. In 1991, the university's six schools—five undergraduate and the graduate school—became colleges. In 1998, MTSU's Honors program became the Honors College, the first in the state. In 2002, approval was granted to redesignate three D.A. programs to Doctor of Philosophy programs, expanding the progressive institution's offerings. Ph.D. degree offerings now include computational sciences, mathematics, and science education (including concentrations in biology education, chemistry education, mathematics education, and interdisciplinary science education), molecular biosciences, economics, English, human performance, public history, and literacy studies.

Since 1911, more than 100,000 students have graduated from MTSU. In the 1980s and 1990s, the institution dedicated resources to become a leader in technology, both in the classroom and in many services to students.

In 1986, James McGill Buchanan ('40) became the first MT alumnus to be awarded the Nobel Prize. He received the Nobel Memorial Prize in Economic Sciences for his pioneering role in the development of the field of public choice, a way of studying the behavior of politicians and bureaucrats. The MTSU Honors College has named a full-tuition fellowship after James Buchanan; this honor is given to 20 students each year who take specialized courses through the Honors College.

Colleges

MTSU is organized into seven colleges:

College of Basic and Applied Sciences
College of Behavioral and Health Sciences
College of Education
College of Liberal Arts
College of Media and Entertainment
Jennings A. Jones College of Business
University College

Faculty
Middle Tennessee State University employs about 900 full-time faculty members, with a student-to-faculty ratio of 20:1.

Academics

Department of Recording Industry

The Department of Recording Industry (often called "RIM" for its former name "Recording Industry Management") is within the College of Media and Entertainment and is the university's most popular program. Due to the large number of students in the program, only a limited number of slots are opened for students to gain candidacy to take upper-division classes.

The RIM program is divided into three concentrations: Music Business, Commercial Songwriting, and Audio Production. Music Business focuses on the marketing and business aspects of the recording, touring, and publishing industries. The Audio Production concentration focuses on recording, mixing, and mastering techniques, and specific technological trends of the industry including surround sound and digital audio editing. Commercial Songwriting is a blend of music business, songwriting, and music theory classes. The department has recording studios on campus, each open 24 hours a day.

The Rolling Stone College Guide recognized MTSU as having "one of the preeminent music business programs in the country."

Department of Aerospace

The Department of Aerospace offers an Aerospace Bachelor of Science degree with six concentrations: Aviation Management, Aerospace Technology, Flight Dispatch, Maintenance Management, Professional Pilot, and Unmanned Aircraft Systems (UAS). An Aeronautical Science master's degree is also available with three concentrations: Aviation Education, Aviation Management, and Aviation Safety and Security Management. Each concentration has been accredited by the Aviation Accreditation Board International, and the aerospace program as a whole has been accredited since 1992. The Department of Aerospace has a working agreement with the single-runway Murfreesboro Municipal Airport to provide many of its classes on-site. (The program will be moving to the airport in neighboring Shelbyville by 2025.) A decommissioned Boeing 727 airliner (number N117FE, donated by FedEx) is housed at the airport as a teaching tool.  Although no longer considered air-worthy, its engines remain functional, and can be restarted for training purposes. American Airlines has also donated a 727 cockpit procedure trainer to MTSU, which allows students to receive their flight engineer rating. It is housed in the Business & Aerospace Building near the center of campus.

The aerospace program's training fleet is made up of Diamond DA40 single-engine aircraft featuring glass cockpits, with an assortment of other single- and multi-engine aircraft available. In 2010, the Department of Aerospace purchased ten radar simulators as well as a one-of-a-kind 360 degree control tower simulator to enhance training for its air traffic control students. These simulators allow students to experience lifelike air traffic control scenarios that will aid in preparing them for training at the FAA Academy in Oklahoma City.

Concrete Industry Management
The Concrete Industry Management program is a four-year Bachelor of Science degree in the College of Basic and Applied Sciences. CIM develops graduates that are broadly educated with technical knowledge in addition to a solid business background. It was started in 1994 by concrete professionals and industry consultants. Since its inception, the CIM program has graduated over 700 alumni.

Department of Human Sciences
The programs offered by the Department of Human Sciences are accredited by the American Association of Family and Consumer Sciences and provide a broad liberal education along with a specialty to prepare students for a wide spectrum of professions. The department also offers numerous opportunities in experiential and service learning. Career opportunities in human sciences include positions in social agencies, government agencies, community services, business, industry, health services, research laboratories, design, merchandising, teaching, and day care.

Programs leading to the Bachelor of Science degree are offered in four majors: Family and Consumer Studies with concentrations in Family and Consumer Sciences Education and Child Development and Family Studies; Interior Design; Nutrition and Food Science with a concentration in dietetics; and Textiles, Merchandising, and Design with concentrations in apparel design and fashion merchandising. The department also offers minors in Human Sciences, Nutrition and Food Science, and Textiles, Merchandising, and Design.

Campus

There are 12 residence halls on campus, as well as two apartment complexes. The residence halls were being renovated and modernized .  In addition to the residence halls, one fraternity and six sororities have chapter houses on Greek Row.

The western section of campus contains most of the college's original buildings, including the oldest classroom building, Kirksey Old Main, and the original dormitories—Monohan, Lyon, Jones and Rutledge Halls. Athletic facilities such as the Murphy Center, Johnny "Red" Floyd Stadium, the Alumni Memorial Gym, Reese Smith Jr. Field, and the university's tennis courts are on the western part of campus.

In the center is the main quad, surrounded by the Learning Resource Center, the Business and Aerospace Building, the Mass Communications Building, and the James E. Walker Library. One of the newest facilities is the  Science Building adjacent to the library, on the south end of campus. The eastern part of campus features some of the newest structures, such as the College of Education, Student Union, and the Academic Classroom which is the newest building at a cost of $47 million. Other notable facilities include the Recreation Center, softball field, intramural fields, and Greek Row.

Middle Tennessee State University strictly regulates the presence of alcohol on campus, prohibiting possession by students while on property owned or controlled by the university, but allowing the sale of alcohol at events that meet certain criteria and have prior approval from the President's Office. In addition, all tobacco products, including electronic cigarettes, are prohibited on campus.

The Japanese Supplementary School in Middle Tennessee (JSMT, 中部テネシー日本語補習校 Chūbu Teneshī Nihongo Hoshūkō), a weekend Japanese education program, holds its classes at Peck Hall, while its school offices are in Jefferson Square.

Student life

Media outlets
Due to a significant emphasis on Mass Communication at MTSU, the campus has several mass media outlets. Sidelines is the campus's editorially independent, student-run news source, with daily content online and special print editions three times per semester. Off Center is an online-only publication sponsored by the Margaret H. Ordubadian University Writing Center. Collage: A Journal of Creative Expression is the Honors College's semesterly magazine for student-submitted literary and artistic creative works. MT10 (formerly known as MTTV), a student-run TV station, is carried locally by Comcast. The two radio stations on MTSU's campus are 88.3 FM WMTS, a student-run radio station, and 89.5 FM WMOT, a publicly supported Americana & Roots Music radio station operated in a partnership with Music City Roots, a weekly Americana live performance entity based in nearby Franklin, Tennessee.

Sidelines
Sidelines, founded in 1925, is the editorially independent, student-run newspaper of MTSU. The physical product is printed by The Tennessean, while the digital edition is hosted at MTSUSidelines.com. The Sidelines office is located in the College of Media and Entertainment's Center for Innovation in Media, a US$700,000 facility opened in 2012 which also hosts other university media outlets. Archives for Sidelines between 1938 and 2011 are available in MTSU's digital collections.

Off Center: A Creative Magazine for the MTSU Community
Off Center, first published online in fall 2016, is a student-led publication produced by the tutors of the Margaret H. Ordubadian University Writing Center which focuses on the creative works of students, faculty, staff, and other campus employees. The creative works include a range of mediums such as poetry, creative writing, graphic design, photography, and paintings, all while supporting diversity of creative voice in a supportive environment.

Scientia et Humanitas 
Scientia et Humanitas is a peer-reviewed journal sponsored by the University Honors College with a focus on allowing undergraduate and graduate students a professional experience into publication while also sharing the academic research on campus. Scientia et Humanitas is available in both print and online publications and was first published in spring 2011.

Student organizations
The university is host to approximately 340 student organizations, fraternities, and interest groups. About five percent of undergraduate men and nine percent of undergraduate women are active in MTSU's Greek system.

MTSU's Greek Life consists of the following social fraternities and sororities:

 Eight IFC fraternities: Alpha Gamma Rho, Alpha Tau Omega, Kappa Alpha Order, Sigma Pi, Phi Delta Theta, Phi Mu Alpha Sinfonia, Sigma Chi, and Phi Kappa Tau.
 Six NPC sororities: Alpha Delta Pi, Alpha Omicron Pi, Alpha Chi Omega, Zeta Tau Alpha, Kappa Delta, and Chi Omega.
 All nine NPHC organizations: Alpha Kappa Alpha, Alpha Phi Alpha, Delta Sigma Theta, Zeta Phi Beta, Iota Phi Theta, Kappa Alpha Psi, Sigma Gamma Rho, Phi Beta Sigma, and Omega Psi Phi.
 Two NALFO organizations: Lambda Theta Alpha and Lambda Theta Phi
 Professional/honor organizations: Alpha Eta Rho, Alpha Kappa Psi, Alpha Psi Omega, Delta Omicron, Kappa Omicron Nu, Pi Sigma Epsilon, Sigma Alpha Iota, Sigma Theta Tau, Sigma Alpha Lambda, Phi Sigma Pi, Phi Kappa Phi, Order of Omega, and Omega Delta Psi

The Band of Blue is considered the largest student organization on campus, maintaining approximately 350 members each year. Membership is open to any university student who can display good marching techniques and a fundamental proficiency on an instrument used in the marching band.

The university hosts MT Lambda, an LGBTQ organization founded in 1988. The group provides access to resources and plans regular events for the LGBTQ+ community, such as the annual SpringOut! pride week held each April.

Athletics

Middle Tennessee's athletic teams, known as the Blue Raiders, compete in Conference USA of the NCAA's Division I in the Football Bowl Subdivision. On November 29, 2012, MTSU announced they had accepted an invitation to the conference, and formally became a part of Conference USA on July 1, 2013. The school transferred from the Sun Belt Conference, and had participated in the Ohio Valley Conference before that.

The most prominent athletic facilities on the campus are Johnny "Red" Floyd football stadium, Murphy Center basketball arena, Reese Smith Jr. baseball field, and Alumni Memorial Gym volleyball court. MTSU has won two national championships: golf in 1965, and men's doubles tennis in 2007. The Blue Raider football team won the Sun Belt Championship two times (2001 and 2006) and has participated in thirteen bowl games (1956, 1959, 1961, 1964, 2006, 2009, 2010, 2013, 2015, 2016, 2017, 2018, & 2021) with a 5-8 bowl record. The Blue Raider Baseball team has sixteen conference titles and fourteen NCAA tournament appearances.

The MTSU mascot is "Lightning", a winged horse based on Pegasus from Greek mythology.

Notable alumni

Some of MTSU's most notable alumni include

 Oscar-nominated actress Sondra Locke
 Grammy Award-winning artist Lecrae
 Politician Albert Gore Sr.
 Nobel Prize–winning economist James M. Buchanan
 NFL quarterback Kelly Holcomb
 Multi-Platinum Producer Tay Keith
 Grammy-nominated audio engineer (Prince) Chris James
 Music executive Bayer Mack
 Nashville Star winner Chris Young
 Film director Seth Christian
 Country music artist Hillary Scott of Lady A
 Composer George S. Clinton
 WNBA players Alysha Clark and Amber Holt
 Rock artist Amy Lee of Evanescence
 Country music artist Hardy
 Alternative rock/ indie rock artist Julien Baker
 NFL All Pro Safety Kevin Byard
 Embattled Rutherford County, Tennessee juvenile court Judge Donna Scott Davenport

Nobel Prize laureates
In 1986, James McGill Buchanan ('40) became the first MTSU alumnus to be awarded the Nobel Prize. Buchanan received the Nobel Memorial Prize in Economic Sciences for his pioneering role in the development of the field of public choice, a way of studying politician's and bureaucrat's behaviors.

In addition, former MTSU economics professor Muhammad Yunus received the Nobel Peace Prize for efforts through microcredit to create economic and social development.

Visiting professor Al Gore received a Nobel Peace Prize for his work in climate change activism.

Notes

References

External links

 
 Middle Tennessee Athletics website

 
Public universities and colleges in Tennessee
1911 establishments in Tennessee
Educational institutions established in 1911